Sorø Municipality is a municipality (Danish, kommune) in Region Sjælland on the island of Zealand (Sjælland) in east Denmark. The main town and the site of its municipal council is the town of Sorø. Other towns in the municipality are Dianalund, Stenlille, and Ruds Vedby.

On 1 January 2007 Sorø municipality was, as the result of Kommunalreformen ("The Municipal Reform" of 2007), merged with existing Dianalund and Stenlille municipalities to form the new Sorø municipality.

Locations
The ten largest urban areas in the municipality are:

The city of Sorø 

The city of Sorø has a population of 7,754 (2015) and is the site of both the municipal council and the county council. It was scheduled to be regional seat for Region Sjælland, one of the five new regions to be implantated in Denmark 1 January 2007.

While by no means the biggest city in Denmark, it has great historical value. It was founded in 1161 by Bishop Absalon, later the founder of Copenhagen, and is the site of Sorø Academy (Danish Sorø Akademi) and Sorø Klosterkirke, the church where Absalon is buried, along with other notable Danes, including royalty. Queen Margaret I of Denmark was buried at this church until moved to Roskilde Cathedral in Roskilde.

Politics

Municipal council
Sorø's municipal council consists of 25 members, elected every four years.

Below are the municipal councils elected since the Municipal Reform of 2007.

Image gallery

References 

 Municipal statistics: NetBorger Kommunefakta, delivered from KMD a.k.a. Kommunedata (Municipal Data)
 Municipal mergers and neighbors: Eniro new municipalities map

External links 

 
 East Denmark tourism information

 
Municipalities of Region Zealand
Municipalities of Denmark
Populated places established in 2007